Puigpedrós is a mountain located at the border between Catalonia, Spain and the département of Pyrénées-Orientales (France).

Part of the Pyrenees, its summit has an elevation of 2,912 metres above sea level.

See also
Mountains of Catalonia

References

Mountains of Catalonia
Mountains of the Pyrenees
Emblematic summits of Catalonia